Communist Party of Germany v. the Federal Republic of Germany was a 1957 European Commission of Human Rights decision which upheld the dissolution of the Communist Party of Germany by the Federal Constitutional Court a year earlier.

Background
The German federal government had petitioned for the Communist Party to be banned in 1952 on the basis that the party's revolutionary practice means "the impairment or the abolition of the fundamental liberal democratic order in the Federal Republic". Following hearings, the Federal Constitutional Court ordered in 1956 that the party be dissolved and its assets confiscated, and banned the creation of substitute organizations. The neo-Nazi Socialist Reich Party had been banned due to the same government petition back in 1952, but the Communist Party's lengthy defense in part had caused a delay. The party argued that the constitutional article 21(2) itself was unconstitutional because it violated the rights of freedom of speech and freedom of association, and that the Marxist–Leninist ideology was a "science" that should not be subjected to judicial review.

Decision
The Commission referred to the article 17 of the European Convention on Human Rights, which states that no one may use the rights guaranteed by the Convention to seek the abolition of other rights, and found no need to consider the case with respect to articles 9, 10 and 11. It found the appeal inadmissible and thus upheld the ban on the party on the basis that the dictatorship of the proletariat stage advocated by the Communist doctrine in order to establish a regime is "incompatible with the Convention, inasmuch as it includes the destruction of many of the rights or freedoms enshrined therein." As a result, pursuing dictatorship is not compatible with the convention even if it is done with constitutional methods.

Legacy
The decision is a landmark case establishing limits on freedom of expression on speech that endangers democracy or is based on a totalitarian doctrine. Many of the same arguments laid out in this decision were repeated by the European Court of Human Rights when it upheld the ban of the Welfare Party in Refah Partisi (the Welfare Party) and Others v. Turkey in 2001.

See also
Brandenburg v. Ohio
Debs v. United States
Dennis v. United States
Streitbare Demokratie

External links 
Decision by the Commission on the Admissibility of Application No. 250/57 on the European Court of Human Rights website

References

1957 in case law
European Court of Human Rights cases involving Germany
Anti-communism in Germany
Article 9 of the European Convention on Human Rights
Article 10 of the European Convention on Human Rights
Article 11 of the European Convention on Human Rights
Article 17 of the European Convention on Human Rights